Antonio Galdo (born 17 October 1957 in Naples) is an Italian writer and journalist.

Biography
He has collaborated with several publications such as Panorama, Economy, Il Mattino, L'Indipendente, Il Messaggero,  Corriere Adriatico…, in television with RAI, and since 2009 with the website Non Sprecare.

Works
 Denaro Contante, Rizzoli, 1990
 Intervista a Giuseppe De Rita sulla borghesia in Italia, Laterza, 1996
 Ospedale Italia, Il Saggiatore, 1998
 Guai a chi li tocca. L'Italia in ostaggio delle corporazioni: dai medici ai ferrovieri, dai gondolieri ai magistrati, Mondadori, 2000
 Capolinea a Nordest, con Giuseppe De Rita, 2001
 Saranno potenti? Storia, declino e nuovi protagonisti della classe dirigente italiana, Sperling & Kupfer, 2003
 Pietro Ingrao, il compagno disarmato, Sperling & Kupfer, 2004
 Fabbriche. Storie, personaggi e luoghi di una passione italiana, Einaudi, 2007
 Non Sprecare, Einaudi, 2008
 Basta Poco, Einaudi, 2011
 L’eclissi della borghesia, with Giuseppe De Rita, Laterza, 2011
 Non Sprecare edizione tascabile, Einaudi, 2012

References

External links
  Sito di Antonio Galdo
  Sito di Non Sprecare

1957 births
Living people
Italian male writers